Tachosa is a genus of moths of the family Erebidae. The species of this genus are found in Africa.

Species
Tachosa acronyctoides Walker, 1869
Tachosa aspera Kühne, 2004
Tachosa fumata (Wallengren, 1860)
Tachosa guichardi (Wiltshire, 1982)
Tachosa sagittalis (Strand, 1912)

References

afromoths

 
Heteroneura genera